People who served as the mayor of the Municipality of Redfern are:

References

Mayors Redfern
Redfern, Mayors
Mayors of Redfern